Arshad Mehmood or Mahmood may refer to:

Arshad Mehmood (composer) (active from 2003), Pakistani composer, singer and actor in the television and film industry
Arshad Mehmood (singer) (active from 1990), Pakistani singer in the film industry
Arshad Mahmood (field hockey) (born 1947), Pakistani hockey player